Březová is a municipality and village in Uherské Hradiště District in the Zlín Region of the Czech Republic. It has about 1,000 inhabitants.

Etymology
The name of the municipality is derived from the landscape of birch trees (in Czech bříza), which was previously typical for this region.

Geography
It lies in the White Carpathians mountain range.

History

The settlement of the area began with the establishment of the Cistercian monastery Smilheim, which was built in 1261. The first written mention of Březová is from 1492.

Transport
There is the road border crossing to Nová Bošáca in Slovakia.

Sights
The Church of Saints Cyril and Methodius is a cultural monument and the landmark of Březová. Initially, there was a small chapel first mentioned in 1662. In 1747, a little church replaced the chapel. The contemporary church was constructed in 1865.

On 1576 a doctor Tomáš Jordán of Klausenburk mentioned Březová's spring in his medical book about healing water. The spring is considered to be healing and is generally known under the name of Kyselka. The area with the spring is a tourist destination.

A -high wooden observation tower is located in the western part of Březová. It was built together with five other identical towers in 2011.

Notable people
Leoš Janáček (1854–1928), composer; visited Březová for several times to be inspired here by a variety of regional folk songs

References

External links

Villages in Uherské Hradiště District